Pike County is a county located in the U.S. state of Arkansas. As of the 2020 census, the population was 10,171. The county seat is Murfreesboro. Pike County is Arkansas's 25th county, formed on November 1, 1833, and named for Lieutenant Zebulon Pike, the explorer for whom Pikes Peak is named. It is an alcohol prohibition or dry county. The current judge is Dewight Mack.

History
The first known residents of the area now considered Pike County were Native Americans. The Quapaw tribe was prominent in the area, as well as the Kadohadacho, and Cahinnio tribes. Expeditions led by Hernando de Soto and Sieur de La Salle passed through the area. Around 1800, the Kadohadocho tribe migrated to Texas to avoid further repeated attacks by the Osage, who would venture in from the Oklahoma area.

Pike County was part of the Louisiana Purchase of 1803, and on November 1, 1833, Pike County was created out of Clark and Hempstead counties by the Arkansas territorial legislature and named after Zebulon Pike.  A post office was established in what is now Murfreesboro, with the town itself receiving its name from some of its first residents having originated from Murfreesboro, Tennessee. Until it was officially named, Murfreesboro had been referred to as "Forks of the Missouri" or "Three Forks.” Much of the county's documented history was destroyed in the court house fires of 1855 and 1895.

During the Civil War, Pike County men formed two full companies for service in regiments formed in Montgomery County, in the Confederate Army, with the most active being the 4th Arkansas Infantry, and the county was firmly in support of the Confederate States of America. In 1864, Murfreesboro served as a winter quarters for the Confederate regiments assigned to that area, with Union Army regiments wintering just eighteen miles away in and around Antoine.

In 1900, Martin White Greeson, who owned property in Pike County and also owned and operated the Murfreesboro-Nashville Southwest RailRoad, began campaigning for a dam on the Little Missouri River to alleviate flooding. It was not until 1941 that the project was approved, and construction began on June 1, 1948, and was completed on July 12, 1951. The lake created by the dam was named Lake Greeson in Greeson's honor.

In the early 20th century, Rosboro, Arkansas was the headquarters of one of the state's most productive lumber mills and received its name from Thomas Whitaker Rosborough, owner of the lumber company. That company, originating in Rosboro, eventually moved to Springfield, Oregon, where today it is one of the largest forest product producers in the U.S., and it operates under the name of the "Rosboro Timber Company.”

During World War II, Murfreesboro was used as a site to house and work German prisoners of war.

Since the late 19th century, the county's main source of employment has been the timber industry.

Geography

Major highways
 U.S. Highway 70
 Highway 8
 Highway 19
 Highway 26
 Highway 27
 Highway 29
 Highway 84

Adjacent counties
Montgomery County (north)
Clark County (east)
Nevada County (southeast)
Hempstead County (south)
Howard County (west)

National protected area
 Ouachita National Forest (part)

Demographics

2020 census

As of the 2020 United States census, there were 10,171 people, 4,280 households, and 2,969 families residing in the county.

2000 census
As of the 2000 census, there were 11,303 people, 4,504 households, and 3,265 families residing in the county.  The population density was 19 people per square mile (7/km2).  There were 5,536 housing units at an average density of 9 per square mile (4/km2).  The racial makeup of the county was 92.04% White, 3.47% Black or African American, 0.65% Native American, 0.16% Asian, 0.02% Pacific Islander, 2.60% from other races, and 1.07% from two or more races.  3.57% of the population were Hispanic or Latino of any race.

There were 4,504 households, out of which 32.10% had children under the age of 18 living with them, 60.90% were married couples living together, 8.30% had a female householder with no husband present, and 27.50% were non-families. 25.20% of all households were made up of individuals, and 13.40% had someone living alone who was 65 years of age or older.  The average household size was 2.47 and the average family size was 2.94.

In the county, the population was spread out, with 24.90% under the age of 18, 7.30% from 18 to 24, 26.40% from 25 to 44, 24.50% from 45 to 64, and 17.00% who were 65 years of age or older.  The median age was 39 years. For every 100 females there were 97.20 males.  For every 100 females age 18 and over, there were 93.40 males.

The median income for a household in the county was $27,695, and the median income for a family was $32,883. Males had a median income of $27,294 versus $17,266 for females. The per capita income for the county was $15,385.  About 12.80% of families and 16.80% of the population were below the poverty line, including 20.80% of those under age 18 and 20.20% of those age 65 or over.

Government
Over the past few election cycles Pike County has trended heavily towards the GOP. The last Democrat (as of 2020) to carry this county was Bill Clinton in 1996.

Attractions
 Crater of Diamonds State Park & Water park

Communities

Cities
Delight
Glenwood
Murfreesboro (county seat)

Towns
Antoine
Daisy
Nathan
Pisgah
Salem

Census designated place
Kirby
Newhope

Other unincorporated communities
Billstown
Highland
Langley
Lodi
Rosboro

Townships

 Antoine (most of CDP Kirby)
 Brewer
 Clark (Glenwood)
 Eagle (small part of CDP Kirby)
 Missouri (Delight)
 Mountain
 Muddy Fork
 Pike City
 Saline
 Self Creek (Daisy, part of CDP Kirby)
 Thompson (Murfreesboro)
 White
 Wolf Creek (Antoine)

Notable residents
Former U.S. Representative Thomas Dale Alford was born in Pike County. A leading ophthalmologist in Little Rock, he served in Congress from 1959 to 1963, having first been elected as a write-in candidate.
Singer Glen Campbell was born in Billstown, Arkansas, and raised in nearby Delight.
Former Arkansas State Treasurer and state auditor Gus Wingfield was born in Antoine, Arkansas, and attended school in Delight.

See also
 List of lakes in Pike County, Arkansas
 National Register of Historic Places listings in Pike County, Arkansas

References

External links
 Pike County, Arkansas entry on the Encyclopedia of Arkansas History & Culture

 
1833 establishments in Arkansas Territory
Populated places established in 1833